Cis is a comune (municipality) in Trentino in the northern Italian region Trentino-Alto Adige/Südtirol, located about  northwest of Trento.

Cis borders the following municipalities: Bresimo, Livo, Caldes, and Cles.

Demographic evolution

References

Cities and towns in Trentino-Alto Adige/Südtirol